Zeynab Ilhamy (29 December 1859 — 17 May 1918) was an Egyptian princess and a member of the Muhammad Ali Dynasty and Ottoman dynasty.

Life
Princess Zeynab Ilhamy was born on 29 December 1859 in Istanbul. She was the second daughter of Lieutenant General Prince Ibrahim Ilhami Pasha. and Jeshmi Ahu Qadin (died 1905). She was the granddaughter of Khedive Abbas I and Mahivech Hanim. She had two sisters, Princess Emina Ilhamy and Princess Tevhide Ilhamy. 

In 1878, Zeynab married her father's cousin Prince Mahmud Hamdi Pasha fifth son of Isma'il Pasha and Jahan Shah Qadin. The couple had one daughter, who was named Princess Munira Hamdi, born in 1884. The two divorced in 1888.

Death
Zeynab died at Cairo on 17 May 1918, and was buried Hosh al-Basha, Imam al-Shafi'i, Cairo.

Issue
Zeynab and Mahmud Hamdi had one daughter:
Princess Munira Hamdi  (18 July 1884, Cairo — 18 November 1944 - Cairo), married Mohamed Tawfik Naseem Pasha;

Ancestry

References

1859 births
1918 deaths
Muhammad Ali dynasty
Royalty from Istanbul
Egyptian princesses